William Robert Stalker (3 August 1948 – 28 November 1981) was a New Zealand actor, most famous for his roles in television, both in his native country and Australia.

Early life
Stalker was born in Masterton, New Zealand and grew up in Hawke's Bay, the second of seven children to Robert and Zena
Stalker. A keen motorcyclist and adventurer from an early age, he attended the University of Canterbury, where he began his career in theatre.

Career
One of his early acting roles was as a biker in the New Zealand television series Pukemanu, which also starred Ginette MacDonald. In 1971, he joined Bruno Lawrence's musical and theatrical co-operative Blerta, where he performed with many popular New Zealand entertainers. He left the group after one tour in 1972, but returned in 1975 until the group disbanded in 1976. In 1977 he was in the film Wild Man. Stalker was an original regular cast member of soap opera Close to Home.

Stalker moved to Australia in 1979 and was a member of the original main cast of airport drama serial Skyways at which time, in Australia's TV Times, he commented on his career and move from New Zealand (read Bill's comments in 1979 TV Times). His role in Skyways was as Peter Fanelli, head of airport security and ex-cop. Fanelli soon proved to be one of the show's most popular characters, and when Skyways was cancelled in 1981 the character was quickly moved to the police serial Cop Shop, with Fanelli re-entering the police force heading Riverside CIB as a Detective Sergeant (read TV Times on Stalker's run in both soaps and his sudden death).

Death
After nine months with Cop Shop, Stalker was tired of both working in serials and of playing Fanelli. He quit the show to explore various film offers. However, on 28 November 1981, during a weekend break between taping his final scenes for Cop Shop, he was killed when his motorcycle slid and collided with a car in wet weather in Toorak, Victoria. His pillion passenger, then-girlfriend New Zealand born actress Catherine Wilkin, suffered a fractured hip and leg injuries in the accident.

A dedication to Stalker was shown at the end of his final Cop Shop episode.

Personal life
Stalker was married to Donna Boyd-Wilson, but the couple later divorced.

During his time in Blerta, he met Jazz singer Beverly Jean Morrison, who went under the professional name of Beaver, with whom he had two daughters, Fritha and Kate Stalker. He is also survived by his other older children, Eleanor and Greg Carr, twins, who were adopted out as babies. He had been in the process of searching for the twins shortly before his death.

References

External links 
 
 

New Zealand male television actors
Australian male television actors
20th-century New Zealand male actors
Motorcycle road incident deaths
Road incident deaths in Victoria (Australia)
1981 deaths
1948 births